That's Your Funeral  was a BBC sitcom from 1971 about a North of England funeral director called Basil Bulstrode (Bill Fraser).  Storylines used many urban legends about the funeral industry. It was cancelled after one series.

A very similar theme was used far more successfully in the ITV sitcom In Loving Memory.

Film
In 1972, the sitcom was adapted into a film version by Hammer Films. The plot concerns two rival undertakers whose firms are used as fronts for drug smuggling. Directed by John Robins, as well as the usual cast it featured numerous well known actors such as Roy Kinnear, Dennis Price, Sue Lloyd, Richard Wattis, John Ronane and Frank Thornton. However, the film performed poorly at the box office.

See also
 List of films based on British sitcoms

References

External links
 
 

BBC television sitcoms
Comedy Playhouse
Films shot at Pinewood Studios
1972 comedy films
Films based on television series
Hammer Film Productions
British comedy films
Funeral homes in fiction
Television shows about death
Television shows adapted into films
1970s British films